This is a list of diplomatic missions of Ivory Coast, excluding honorary consulates.

Africa

 Algiers (Embassy)

 Luanda (Embassy)

 Ouagadougou (Embassy)

 Yaoundé (Embassy)

 N'Djamena (Embassy)

 Kinshasa (Embassy)

 Cairo (Embassy)

 Malabo (Embassy)

 Addis Ababa (Embassy)

 Libreville (Embassy)

 Accra (Embassy)

 Conakry (Embassy)

 Monrovia (Embassy)

 Tripoli (Embassy)

 Bamako (Embassy)

 Rabat (Embassy)

 Abuja (Embassy)

 Dakar (Embassy)

 Pretoria (Embassy)

 Tunis (Embassy)

Americas

 Brasília (Embassy)

 Ottawa (Embassy)

 Mexico City (Embassy)

 Washington D.C. (Embassy)

Asia

 Beijing (Embassy)
 Guangzhou (Consulate-General)

 New Delhi (Embassy)

 Tehran (Embassy)

 Tel Aviv (Embassy)

 Tokyo (Embassy)

 Beirut (Embassy)

 Doha (Embassy)

 Riyadh (Embassy)
 Jeddah (Consulate-General)

 Seoul (Embassy)

 Ankara (Embassy)

 Dubai (Consulate-General)

Europe

 Vienna (Embassy)

 Brussels (Embassy)

 Copenhagen (Embassy)

 Paris (Embassy)
 Lyon (Consulate-General)

 Berlin (Embassy)

 Rome (Embassy)

 Rome (Embassy)

 The Hague (Embassy)

 Lisbon (Embassy)

 Moscow (Embassy)

 Madrid (Embassy)

 Bern (Embassy)

 London (Embassy)

Multilateral organizations
 African Union
Addis Ababa (Permanent Mission to the African Union)

Brussels (Mission to the European Union)

Geneva (Permanent Mission to the United Nations and international organizations)
New York (Permanent Mission to the United Nations)

Paris (Permanent Mission to UNESCO)

Gallery

See also
 Foreign relations of Ivory Coast
 List of diplomatic missions in Ivory Coast

Notes

References
Ivory Coast Portal
Ministry of Foreign Affairs of Ivory Coast (French)

 
Ivory Coast
Missions